The Bahamas Girl Guides Association is the national Guiding organization of the Bahamas. It serves 2,303 members (as of 2003). Founded in 1915, the girls-only organization became a full member of the World Association of Girl Guides and Girl Scouts in 1975.

Program and ideals
The association is divided in four sections according to age:
 Sunflowers – ages 5 and 6 
 Brownies – ages 7 to 10
 Guides – ages 10 to 14
 Rangers – ages 14 to 18

Guide Promise 
I promise that I will do my best,
To do my duty to God,
To serve the Queen and my country,
To help other people
and to keep the Guide Law.

Guide Law 
 A Guide is loyal and can be trusted
 A Guide is helpful
 A Guide is polite and considerate
 A Guide is friendly and a sister to all Guides
 A Guide is kind to animals and respects all living things
 A Guide is obedient
 A Guide is cheerful and has courage in all difficulties
 A Guide makes good use of her time
 A Guide takes care of her own possessions and those of other people
 A Guide is self-controlled in all she thinks, says and does

See also
 The Scout Association of the Bahamas

Bahamas
Scouting and Guiding in the Bahamas
Youth organizations established in 1915